Central Davidson High School (commonly referred to as "Central", "CHS" or "CDHS") is a public high school in Lexington, North Carolina. Central was established in 1957 and is located along NC HWY 47. It is part of the Davidson County Schools system and serves parts of the Lexington, Southmont, Linwood, Hedrick's Grove and Holly Grove areas. The school is accredited by the Southern Association of Colleges and Schools.

History
In the fall of 1957, Central opened after the merger of Davis-Townsend, Linwood, Southmont, and Silver Valley grades 9–12 into one high school. A site on NC HWY 47 was selected for the new school. The same year it opened, the Board of Education named the new consolidated high school "Central High School". Central's first class, the class of 1958, decided on the school's mascot, the Spartan, and colors of red, black, silver and white. They were originally going to choose the Trojan as the school mascot but decided on the Spartan instead. "In 1970 the Board of Education authorized the purchase of land for the new high school (our current building) and students began classes in the first phase of the building in 1973."

The new location of the high school, which started construction in September 1971, was right next door to its old campus, which has since then been the home of Central Davidson Middle School. The commons areas, gym, band room, and vocational classrooms weren't completed until a few years later. Prior to that, students had to eat sandwiches in the media center, and play basketball games at the middle school's gym. In 1981 Central's new football stadium, Spartan Community Stadium, was built, and it wasn't until the late eighties that they paved the track. Ground was broken in October 2007 for a one-story, 12-class room addition, which opened in the fall of the 2008–2009 school year.

Administration
Principal: Tony Smith (Intertim)
Assistant principals: Eric Anderson, Sarah Horne

Feeder schools
Davis-Townsend Elementary 
Southmont Elementary 
Southwood Elementary 
Central Davidson Middle

Advanced Placement courses
AP Biology
AP Calculus
AP Chemistry
AP English Language and Composition
AP English Literature and Composition
AP Environmental Science
AP Human Geography
AP Statistics
AP US History

Alma mater
Hail, Central, Hail 
We proudly stand as Central Spartans, 	
United as we share 	
A bond that's built on love and friendship 	
And comes from those who care.		
Lift your voices, shout your praises, 	
Over hill and vail; 	
Here's to thee, our Alma Mater, 	
Hail, Central, Hail.	
Through the years may see us wander 
From these hallowed halls, 	
We will always love and honor 	
The school within these walls.	
Lift your voices, shout your praises,  
Over hill and vail; 	
Here's to thee, our Alma Mater, 
Hail, Central, Hail.

Athletics
Central is a member of the 3A Mid Piedmont Conference. Central's biggest rivals are North Davidson and West Davidson High Schools.

The sports teams of Central are:
Baseball
Basketball
Cross country
Football
Golf
Soccer
Softball
Swimming
Tennis
Track and field
Volleyball
Wrestling

Sporting achievements

Central's softball team finished 5th out of 25 in the country in the 2008 US Today/National Fastpitch Coaches Association poll. Central was one out of only two high schools in North Carolina to be recognized nationally in fastpitch softball in 2008.

On June 25, 2009, the women's softball team was given the key to the city of Lexington, North Carolina by former Mayor John Walser.

For the 2011–2012 and 2012–2013 school years, Central won the Wells Fargo Cup for the Central Carolina Conference. Central achieved this due to winning conference championships in the spring sports of men's and women's track and field, softball and women's soccer.

Band program
The band program is made up of two concert bands (the Wind Ensemble and Symphonic Band), which meet daily during the school year, as well as an after-school and voluntary marching band (the Spartan Legion Marching Band). The concert bands perform around four concerts each year, and also perform at the State Band Contest, where they regularly receive superior ratings. The Wind Ensemble was invited to perform at the North Carolina Music Educator's Convention in 2005. In 2016, the Wind Ensemble was invited to play for the Army Band in Washington, D.C. while also receiving a private lesson from the Army Band conductor. March 21, 2005, was proclaimed "Central Davidson Band Day" in North Carolina in honor of the band's performance at the National Festival of States in Washington D.C.

Notable alumni
Henrietta Walls; one of the first three African-American female scholarship athletes at the University of North Carolina at Chapel Hill. Played professional basketball for the Washington Mystics, and overseas.

References

External links
Central Davidson's official website

1957 establishments in North Carolina
Educational institutions established in 1957
Public high schools in North Carolina
Schools in Davidson County, North Carolina